Li Dongying (December 14, 1920 - September 22, 2020) was a Chinese metallurgist and one of the founders of China's rare metal industry.

Biography
Li was born in Beijing on  December 14, 1920. After graduating from Fu Jen Catholic University in 1948, he was dispatched to Shenyang as a factory manager. In 1953, he was transferred to Beijing, where he successively served as vice president, deputy chief engineer, chief engineer, and deputy party secretary of the Beijing Research Institute of Nonferrous Metals (formerly Comprehensive Research Institute of Nonferrous Metals). In December 1980, he co-founded the Chinese Society of Rare Earths (CSRE) in Beijing. On September 22, 2020, Li died in Beijing at the age of 99.

Honours and awards
 1987 State Science and Technology Progress Award (First Class)
 1989 State Science and Technology Progress Award (First Class)
 1995 Member of the Chinese Academy of Engineering (CAE)
 June 2012 "Engineering Award" of the 9th Guanghua Engineering Science and Technology Award

References

1920 births
2020 deaths
Engineers from Beijing
Catholic University of Peking alumni
Members of the Chinese Academy of Engineering